Malta competed in the 2010 Commonwealth Games held in Delhi, India, from 3 to 14 October 2010.

Team Malta at the 2010 Commonwealth Games

Athletics

Women
Track

Lawn Bowls

Team Malta consisted of 7 lawn bowls players.

Men

Women

See also
 2010 Commonwealth Games

References

External links 
 Times of India
 Malta Olympic Committee

Nations at the 2010 Commonwealth Games
2010
2010 in Maltese sport